Convoys PQ 9 and 10 were  Arctic convoys sent from Great Britain by the Western Allies to aid the Soviet Union during World War II. They sailed together in early February 1942 and arrived in Murmansk without loss.

Ships
Convoys PQ 9 and 10 together comprised ten ships; three British, four Soviet, one American, one Norwegian and one of Panamanian registry. 
These were joined in the last stage of the voyage by a Soviet destroyer and three Royal Navy minesweepers based at Murmansk.

Voyage
PQ 9 sailed from Scotland for Iceland in mid-January, where it was joined by ships from the Americas. PQ 10 was due to follow, but delays and failures meant that just one ship Trevorian, sailed for Reykjavik, on 26 January 1942. 
Meanwhile, PQ 9's departure on 17 January had been delayed after the Admiralty received reports of a sortie by the German battleship .
It was decided that Trevorian would join the ships of PQ 9, rather than wait for PQ 10 to be re-formed. 
The combined convoy of ten ships sailed from Reykjavik on 1 February. It was undetected by German aircraft or U-boats in the continuous darkness of the polar night, and arrived safely at Murmansk on 10 February.

Ships in Convoy PQ 9

Ships in Convoy PQ 10

Notes

References
 Clay Blair : Hitler's U-Boat War Vol I (1996) 
 Paul Kemp : Convoy! Drama in Arctic Waters (1993)  
 Stephen Roskill : The War at Sea 1939-1945   Vol II (1956).  ISBN (none)
 Bernard Schofield : (1964) The Russian Convoys BT Batsford  ISBN (none) 
  PQ 9/10 at Convoyweb

PQ 09 10